The Institute of Materials, Minerals and Mining (IOM3) is a UK engineering institution whose activities encompass the whole materials cycle, from exploration and extraction, through characterisation, processing, forming, finishing and application, to product recycling and land reuse. It exists to promote and develop all aspects of materials science and engineering, geology, mining and associated technologies, mineral and petroleum engineering and extraction metallurgy, as a leading authority in the worldwide materials and mining community.

It is a registered charity governed by royal charter and in 2021 had a gross income of £3.86million. The institute is also a member of the UK Science Council.

In 2019 the institute celebrated 150 years since the establishment of the Iron and Steel Institute, a learned society that IOM3 now encompasses.

Structure
Having resided at Carlton House Terrace off Pall Mall in St James's in central London since 2002, the institute moved to 297 Euston Road on 30 June 2015. The organisation has its education, marketing and knowledge transfer office in Grantham, and its Membership office in Stoke on Trent.

Members of the institute come from a variety of backgrounds, from students to company chief executives. Members qualify for different grades of membership, ranging from Affiliate to Fellow of the Institute of Materials, Minerals and Mining (FIMMM), depending on academic qualifications and professional experience. IOM3 has an individual membership of over 18,000, and represents a combination of scientific, technical and human resources which links industry, government, research and the academic world.

Almost 60 UK 'local societies' are affiliated with the institute, covering a wide range of disciplines including ceramics, composites, mining, packaging, polymers and metallurgy, and organising events throughout the year.

Technical Communities
Since April 2022 IOM3 has 22 Technical Community groups representing the breadth of disciplines covered and the materials cycle. These groups previously known as Divisions are now termed as the "IOM3 XXXXX Group" with a common identity and branding/logo. 
  IOM3 Adhesion and Adhesives Group (formerly the Society of Adhesion and Adhesives, SAA) https://www.iom3.org/group/adhesion-adhesives-group.html
  IOM3 Applied Earth Science Group – https://www.iom3.org/group/applied-earth-science-group.html
  IOM3 Biomedical Applications Group - https://www.iom3.org/group/biomedical-applications-group.html
  IOM3 Ceramics Group ( formerly the Institute of Ceramics until 1993 and Ceramics Society) https://www.iom3.org/group/ceramics-group.html
  IOM3 Composites Group (formerly the British Composites Society, BCS) https://www.iom3.org/group/composites-group.html
  IOM3 Construction Materials Group - https://www.iom3.org/group/construction-materials-group.html
  IOM3 Defence, Safety and Security Group https://www.iom3.org/group/defence-safety-security-group.html 
  IOM3 Elastomer Group (formerly the Rubber in Engineering Group, RIEG) https://www.iom3.org/group/elastomer-group.html
  IOM3 Energy Materials Group https://www.iom3.org/group/energy-materials-group.html
  IOM3 Energy Transition Group https://www.iom3.org/group/energy-transition-group.html
  IOM3 Iron & Steel Group https://www.iom3.org/group/iron-steel-group.html
  IOM3 Materials Characterisation and Properties Group https://www.iom3.org/group/materials-characterisation-properties-group.html
  IOM3 Materials Processing and Manufacturing Group https://www.iom3.org/group/materials-processing-manufacturing-group.html 
  IOM3 Minerals Processing and Extractive Metallurgy Group https://www.iom3.org/group/mineral-processing-extractive-metallurgy-group.html
  IOM3 Mining Technology Group https://www.iom3.org/group/mining-technology-group.html
  IOM3 Natural Materials Group https://www.iom3.org/group/natural-materials-group.html
  IOM3 Non-ferrous and Light Metals Group https://www.iom3.org/group/non-ferrous-light-metals-group.html
  IOM3 Packaging Group (formerly the Institute of Packaging, up to 2005 and the Packaging Society) https://www.iom3.org/group/packaging-group.html
  IOM3 Polymer Group https://www.iom3.org/group/polymer-group.html
  IOM3 Surface Technologies Group – includes the Corrosion subgroup, and the former Institute of Vitreous Enamelling, IVE https://www.iom3.org/group/surface-technologies-group.html
  IOM3 Sustainable Development Group, includes the Resources Strategy Group, RSG https://www.iom3.org/group/sustainable-development-group.html
  IOM3 Wood Technology Group https://www.iom3.org/group/wood-technology-group.html

History
The institute's roots go back to the Iron and Steel Institute. In 1869, ironmaster William Menelaus convened and chaired a meeting at the Midland Railway's Queen's Hotel in Birmingham, West Midlands, which led to the founding of the Iron and Steel Institute, which received its Royal Charters in 1899. Menelaus was its president from 1875 to 1877, and in 1881 was awarded the Bessemer Gold Medal. In 1974 the Iron and Steel Institute merged into the Institute of Metals. The Institute of Metals then merged in 1993 with The Institute of Ceramics and The Plastics and Rubber Institute (PRI) to form the Institute of Materials (IoM). The PRI was itself a merger of The Plastics Institute and the Institution of the Rubber Industry (known as the IRI) during the 1980s, a reflection of the declining UK rubber manufacturing industry during this period.

IOM3 was formed from the merger of the Institute of Materials and the Institution of Mining and Metallurgy (IMM) in June 2002.

More recent mergers include the Institute of Packaging (2005), the Institute of Clay Technology (2006) the Institute of Wood Science (2009) and the Institute of Vitreous Enamellers (2010).

List of presidents

Function
The institute ensures that courses in materials, minerals and mining technology and engineering conform to the standards for professional registration with the Engineering Council UK, establishes codes of practice and monitors legislative matters affecting members' professional interests.

The professional development programme run by the institute helps contribute to members' career enhancement towards senior grades of membership and Chartered Scientist (CSci) and Chartered Engineer (CEng) status.

Members benefit from reduced rates for the institute's many books, journals and conferences and from access to the institute's Information Services. These include extensive library resources as well as a team of materials experts who provide consultancy services to Institute members, and to companies who have joined the institute's Industrial Affiliate Scheme.

Activities
The institute provides a range of activities and initiatives to benefit the materials and mining community.

The institute's educational activities aim to promote the materials discipline to younger generations by allowing access, through the Schools Affiliate Scheme, to a range of educational resources and materials. The institute has very close links with schools and colleges and is responsible for accrediting university and college courses and industrial training schemes. The Education Department offers teachers courses and teaching resources on materials, as well as careers advice for students. Many Institute publications such as definitive textbooks are available to students at reduced prices. The institute also offers a series of grants and bursaries to encourage students, and organises events such as the Young Persons' Lecture Competition.

Publications
The institute's trading subsidiary, IOM Communications Ltd, is responsible for producing the institute's journals. These include the members' journals (magazines) Materials World magazine  and Clay Technology. Materials World now incorporates The Packaging Professional and Wood Focus. The institute's range of learned journals is published by Taylor & Francis, including the Ironmaking and Steelmaking journal, Surface Engineering, Powder Metallurgy, Corrosion Engineering, International Materials Reviews and Materials Science and Technology.. The institute also publishes IMMAGE (Information on Mining, Metallurgy and Geological Exploration), a reference database of abstracts and citations of scientific and engineering literature for the international minerals industry, and has links to OneMine, a database of mining publications.

Advice
The Materials Information Service is a service of the institute which has been giving advice to industry on the selection and use of materials since 1988. This is now part of the institute's Information Services which includes technical enquiry and library services for the materials, minerals and mining sectors, an information help desk, regionally based advisors and related services. Companies can gain access to the institute's information resources by joining its Industrial Affiliate Scheme.

Conferences
The institute's Conference Department organises conferences, events and exhibitions with the institute's technical committees to help keep members and other delegates informed of the latest developments within the materials, minerals and mining arena. The highlight of the conference calendar is the bi-annual Materials Congress.

Awards
The IOM3 grants several awards including:

 Fellowship: Fellow of the Institute of Materials, Minerals and Mining (FIMMM)
 The Bessemer Gold Medal is an annual prize awarded by the institute for "outstanding services to the steel industry". It was established and endowed by Sir Henry Bessemer in 1874. It was first awarded to Isaac Lowthian Bell in 1874. The 2016 award was to Alan Cramb.
 The Silver Medal is awarded annually to an outstanding young scientist (under the age of 35) in recognition of an outstanding contribution to a field of interest. In addition the institute has many other significant awards for Personal Achievement and Published Works covering materials, minerals and mining. In particular there are awards covering surface engineering, biomedical materials, ceramics, rubber and plastics, iron and steel and automotive areas. There are also awards covering education and local societies. Details can be accessed here.

Youth
Engineering Extravaganza was launched to encourage youngsters to consider careers in engineering.

See also

 List of mechanical engineering awards

References

Further reading
The Institute produces the magazines Materials World and Clay Technology. They are available to members or by subscription. Materials World now incorporates The Packaging Professional and Wood Focus magazines.
 Design exchange: Institute of Materials, Minerals and Mining
  Design exchange: Materials Knowledge Transfer Network
 Materials Science: Materials Knowledge Transfer Network

2002 establishments in the United Kingdom
Bessemer Gold Medal
Charities based in London
ECUK Licensed Members
Engineering societies based in the United Kingdom
Geology organizations
Materials science organizations
Mining in the United Kingdom
Mining organizations
Organisations based in the London Borough of Camden
Organizations established in 2002